The Bishop of Perth may refer to:

 Anglican Bishop of Perth, precursor title of the Anglican Archbishop of Perth
 Roman Catholic Bishop of Perth, precursor title of the Roman Catholic Archbishop of Perth